Moldoveni is a commune in Neamț County, Western Moldavia, Romania. It is composed of two villages, Hociungi and Moldoveni.

References

Communes in Neamț County
Localities in Western Moldavia